Holly grevillea is a common name for several plants and may refer to:

Grevillea aquifolium, endemic to South Australia and Victoria
Grevillea ilicifolia, native to Australia

Grevillea taxa by common name